Constantin Postoiu (born 13 October 1959) is a Romanian rower. He competed in the men's coxless pair event at the 1980 Summer Olympics.

References

1959 births
Living people
Romanian male rowers
Olympic rowers of Romania
Rowers at the 1980 Summer Olympics
People from Ialomița County